Kanekotrochus boninensis is a species of sea snail, a marine gastropod mollusk in the family Trochidae, the top snails.

Description

Distribution
This marine species occurs off Japan.

References

 Okutani T. (2001). Six new bathyal and shelf Trochoidean species in Japan. Venus 60(3): 121-127
 Dekker H. (2006). Description of a new species of Kanekotrochus (Gastropoda: Trochidae) from Vietnam. Miscellanea Malacologia, 2(1): 1-4

External links

boninensis
Gastropods described in 2001